Bettina Allentoft  (born 16 November 1973) is a Danish footballer who played as a defender for the Denmark national team. She was part of the team at the 1995 FIFA World Cup.

References

External links
 

1973 births
Living people
Danish women's footballers
Denmark women's international footballers
Place of birth missing (living people)
1995 FIFA Women's World Cup players
Women's association football defenders